Víctor Suances y Díaz del Río was a Spanish military officer who served as the last colonial administrator of Spanish Guinea from August 1966 until the independence of Equatorial Guinea in October 1968. During his tenure as colonial administrator, Spanish Guinea held a constitutional referendum and a general election in the months leading to independence, in which Francisco Macías Nguema was elected as the country's first president.

References

Citations

Bibliography 

Date of birth missing
Date of death missing
Spanish military personnel
Spanish colonial governors and administrators
History of Equatorial Guinea